Diego del Alcázar Silvela (born August 30, 1950 in Avila, Spain) is Grandee of Spain and the 10th Marquess of la Romana (direct descendant of Pedro Caro y Sureda, 3rd Marquis of la Romana, who led the Spanish troops in Denmark in 1807–1808 during the Peninsular war). Del Alcázar studied law, political sciences and business administration in the Complutense University of Madrid and the Sorbonne, Paris.

He is married to María Benjumea Cabeza de Vaca, entrepreneur and president of Infoempleo.

History and Peninsular War
The late Pedro Caro y Sureda (1761–1811) was a noble and enlightened Mallorcan, whose adventures and bravery as a General in the Spanish army in the Peninsular War gave him the gratitude of the Spanish monarchy and the trust of Duke of Wellington, as mentioned by Elizabeth Longford in Wellington:  The Years of the Sword. 

The Third Marquis of la Romana stood out for his meticulous education acquired in the Ecole de la Trinité at Lyon, in France, and completed at Salamanca University and The Nobles Royal Seminary where he inclined towards the humanities and languages which would subsequently become of great use in his war accomplishments in Europe.

He participated in the reconquest of Menorca and in the Battle of Gibraltar, and later went on to lead various diplomatic missions in Europe.  In 1793, the colonel of cavalry Romana fought against France in the War of the First Coalition, and in 1802, he was named General Captain of Catalonia and Chief of Engineers Corps in 1805.  Two years later, King Carlos IV, pressured by Napoleon, agreed to send troops to support the Napoleonic army in Germany and the Marquis of la Romana to command the Division of the North. 
 
Don Pedro Caro and his unit found themselves in 1808 in Denmark under the command of Marshall Bernadotte (Prince of Pontecorvo, Governor of the Hanseatic towns and Général-en-Chef of the Elbe Army, later Charles XIV John of Sweden, King of Sweden and Norway (1818). This part of the Spanish history is somewhat unknown in Spain, but in Denmark this episode left a profound mark in the literature, gastronomy and customs in the Danish culture. The Danish national writer, Hans Christian Andersen, in his book "Un Viaje por España" (Travels in Spain) writes about his childhood memory when he, at 3 years old, met the Princess of his life, Spain.  A popular song from the period also tells about one burning cigarette end thrown by a Spaniard, set up a fire the castle of Koldinghus (“¡Castillo de Kolding! ¡Castillo de Kolding!, Hay que quemarlo hasta los cimientos, con la cerilla del español y el cigarrillo de su boca”). 
 
The War of Spanish Independence broke out against the Napoleonic invasion and of the coronation of José I as the King of Spain. The Marquis of La Romana and his division refused to swear an oath to the new King.  
 
The Marquis of la Romana did not trust him and with the help of the British, was able to repatriate his division to Spain.  Romana and his men arrived in Santander where he was appointed Commander of the Galician Armada, at which point he was able to achieve the withdrawal of the French from Galicia and Asturias.

It is, perhaps, the lucidity and the determination of the Marquis of la Romana  quickly repatriate on 21 August 1808 his 9,000 men from the island of Langeland, Denmark, with the help of British ships, to the coast of Cantabria and from there to support the offensive against the French, that is one of the most pointed episodes of Spanish military history.

The Third Marquis of la Romana is the example of the trajectory of a cultured polyglot, who enjoyed telling anecdotes such as the episode in which Manuel de Godoy offered him a false clock.  He was an enlightened man who knew how to rise to the heights that the historic moment asked of him.

Bicentennial Celebration of Marquis of la Romana
In 2007 and 2008 the figure of this cultivated man was commemorated, Patron of the Arts, artifice of a splendid library and a magnificent collection of paintings of Francisco de Goya, belonging to the current Marquis of la Romana, Diego del Alcázar, who knew how to reconcile a great diplomatic ability with the courage and the loyalty to his country in a tormented period of history, marked by the violence of war.

The first cycle of Conferences were celebrated in Mallorca, Spain, by the Amigos de los Museos Militares and Instituto de Empresa Foundation. In January 2008 The Instituto de Empresa Foundation and The Madrid Royal Academic Society of the Friends of the Country (Real Sociedad Económica Matritense de Amigos del País) inaugurated in the Lujanes Tower of Madrid a week long cycle of conferences ((Bicentennial of Marquis of la Romana). Among the speakers there were Hugo O'Donnell, Duke of Tetuan, who gave a lecture on "The Marquis of la Romana’s expeditionary corps as reflected in the prints by the Suhr brothers".

During the spring of 2008 various events were also organized in Denmark. These were organized by four museums in Denmark, with a title "When the Spaniards came - a come together within cultures in 1808" (Cuando llegaron los españoles – un encuentro entre culturas en 1808).

Entrepreneurship and business
As an independent entrepreneur Diego del Alcázar has been involved in the start-up of numerous businesses in Spain, including Aguas de Mondariz, Balneario de Mondariz, Publicidad Gisbert, Group Gaceta and Thomil. He was the founder of IE Business School with the collaboration of a group of entrepreneurs in 1974, and became the driving force behind the school. Today he is the President of IE Business School and President of IE Foundation . He is also a trustee of Madrid’s Complutense University. Until 2009, he was also a Member of the Board of Directors at ONO Cable Networks.
On 24 September 2007, he was appointed Chairman of the biggest media conglomerate of Spain, Vocento ( Grupo Vocento ). . The Vocento group includes historical brands as ABC , regional newspapers, online media, radio and TV. Vocento is listed in the Madrid Stock Exchange (Bolsa de Madrid). The speech of the Chairman on the latest Board of Directors of Vocento can be read here: .

Art collector and patron of the arts
A keen supporter of the arts, he is vice-president of the Foundation for the Support of History of Hispanic Art (The Fundación de Apoyo a la Historia del Arte Hispánico), which backs young doctorates in arts and publishes their works, and vice-president of the Spanish Foundation for the Development of Corporate Patronage. In 1985, in collaboration with the José Ortega y Gasset Foundation , he created the Juan Lladó Award (Premio Juan Lladó), which is now recognized as one of the most prestigious awards within the business community in the field of patronage.
 
Diego del Alcázar’s personal interests include collecting classical and contemporary art. During the past three years the collection of his paintings have formed part of the most famous museum’s  temporary exhibitions worldwide, including Guggenheim, Museo del Prado, The Tate Gallery in the UK, and Los Angeles Museum of Art. 
 
Del Alcázar recently completed a 12-year restoration of Palacio de Tabladillo, a noble palace in northern Spain, which won the Special Mention Award, in the category of Conservation of Architectural Heritage, of Europa Nostra, a European Union Prize for Cultural Heritage / Europa Nostra Awards in 2006.

The earliest references on record to the “place” and tower and municipality and inheritance of the Palace appear in the 8th century. From the late Middle Ages to the mid 15th century, the site’s overriding priority was that of protection and defence as evidenced by the “tower-fortress”, architectonic style, complemented with an additional storey. During the 16th century, the influence of the renaissance movement that had taken place in Italy during the previous century began to spread throughout Europe, fuelling the renovation of Spain’s older civil buildings to bring them into line with the new style, and equipping them with the courtyards and façades that are so characteristic of 16th-century Spanish renaissance palaces.

At this time in history, when there was no longer such an urgent need to make defence an overriding objective, property extensions were now mainly for aesthetic purposes and hence the stronghold became a prime example of suburban noble architecture of the 16th century, markedly renaissance in style, shedding the medieval functions described later.

This example is an unusual one in Castilian – and Spanish - architecture and history because hardly any Medieval and  Renaissance mansions remained in the countryside as the Monarchs insisted on the presence of the nobles in the Court. Only at the end of the 18th century and in Andalusia did noble mansions appear outside the towns.

This is therefore an unusual house for Spain, one that existed at the same time as the great Italian houses or villas. It gives witness to how life was lived as from the High Middle Ages and is therefore a significant part of the Spanish Cultural heritage.

Distinctions
Diego del Alcázar holds the Spanish Grand Cross of the Civil Order of Alfonso X El Sabio (Gran Cruz de la Orden de Alfonso X el Sabio). This distinction is granted by the Minister of Education and Culture of Spain to Spaniards or foreigners for extraordinary contributions in the fields of education, science, culture, teaching or research.

Selected bibliography
El Marqués de la Romana - L'expedició a Dinamarca (1807–1808), by Miquel Costa, with foreword by Romà Pinya Homs, published by El Tall editorial, Mallorca, 1990 . Available in Catalán
El Marqués de la Romana y el Mariscal Bernadotte - La epopoya singular de la División del Norte en Dinamarca (1808), by Magnus Mörner, published by Centro de Estudios Políticos y Constitucionales, Madrid, 2004 . Available in Spanish
La Expedición del Marqués de la Romana, by Magnus Mörner, published by Fundación Instituto de Empresa, Madrid, 2007 . A cover of the book:  . Available in Spanish
Militaria, Revista de cultura militar - XIII Jornadas "La Expedición del Marqués de la Romana" (Guerra de la Independencia), published by Amigos de los Museos Militares, Madrid, 2008, volume 22 []. Available in Spanish
La turbulenta vida del Conde de Montijo, by Andrés Cassinello Pérez, published by Editorial Camiño do Faro, Coruña, 2008 . Available in Spanish
Militärhistorisk Tidskrift 2008, published by Försvarshögskolan (Swedish National Defence College), Sweden, 2008 []. Articles available in English and Swedish.
Da spaniolerne kom - Krig og kulturmode 1808, published by Wormianum, Denmark, 2009  . Available in Danish.

External links
IE Business School: www.ie.edu
Vocento: www.vocento.com
Bicentenary of Marquis de la Romana: www.bicentenariolaromana.com
 About ISBN in Spain: www.mcu.es/libro/CE/AgenciaISBN/BBDDLibros/Sobre.html

Interviews
Fuchs, Dale. "A coming of age for Spain's contemporary art scene", Herald Tribune, February 12, 2006.
Crawford, Leslie. "Spain relaxed as it embraces the benefits", Financial Times, April 24, 2007.

1950 births
IE Business School people
Grandees of Spain
Living people
Marquesses of Romana
Spanish art collectors
University of Paris alumni
Spanish expatriates in France